A nightcore edit is a version of a track that increases the pitch and speeds up its source material by approximately 35%. This gives an effect almost identical to playing a 33⅓-RPM vinyl record at 45 RPM. This 35% increase in RPM causes the note C4 to become slightly lower in pitch than the note F#4 (261.63 Hz becomes 353.19 Hz) which is an increase of approximately 5 and a half semitones.

The name is derived from the Norwegian musical duo Nightcore, which released pitch-shifted versions of trance and eurodance songs. Nightcore is also commonly associated and accompanied with anime and otaku culture, with many YouTube thumbnails of nightcore remixes containing anime characters and art.

History

2000s: Origins
The term nightcore was first used in 2001 as the name for a school project by Norwegian DJ duo Thomas S. Nilsen and Steffen Ojala Søderholm, known by their stage names DJ TNT and DJ SOS respectively. The name Nightcore means "we are the core of the night, so you'll dance all night long", stated in its website named "Nightcore is Hardcore". The two were influenced by pitch-shifted vocals in German group Scooter's hardcore songs "Nessaja" and "Ramp! (The Logical Song)", stating in an interview that "There were so few of these kinds of artists, we thought that mixing music in our style would be a pleasure for us to listen to" and "Nightcore has become a style of music, a way to make the music happier – 'happy hardcore' as they say."

The duo set a template of a track in the style: a 25–30% speed-up (commonly to around 160 to 180 beats per minute) of a trance or eurodance song. The nightcore music has been compared to happy hardcore and bubblegum bass because of its fast tempos, energetic feel, and high-pitched vocals. Nightcore made five albums of sped-up versions of trance recordings, including its 2002 thirteen-track debut album Energized and the group’s later albums Summer Edition 2002, L'hiver, Sensación and Caliente. The group’s first album was made with eJay, while all of its later work was made with what the duo described as "top-secret" programs. All of its records were sold to their friends and DJs around the group’s area. Nightcore's works started appearing on services such as LimeWire in mid-2003 and YouTube in 2006. The first nightcore track to appear on the latter site was "Dam Dadi Doo" by the duo. Only two of the project's albums have surfaced on the Internet. One of the first people to distribute nightcore music on YouTube was a user going by the name Maikel631, beginning in 2008. The user uploaded about 30 original tracks by Nightcore on the Web site. In 2009, they found a "new" nightcore track, as well as the technique to make material in the style:

2010s: Popularity
One of the first major nightcore videos was for Rockefeller Street, a song by Getter Jaani that was performed at Eurovision 2011. The song became an internet meme after the nightcore version was posted to YouTube by a user known as Andrea, who was known as an Osu! player. From there, the music rose in popularity with more people applying the nightcore treatment to more non-dance genres such as pop music and hip hop. Many of the pioneer uploaders of nightcore including Maikel631 have called these non-dance edits "fake". The nightcore scene then crossed over to SoundCloud with the help of artist lilangelboi, who had released around ten to fifteen edits on the service before signing with Manicure Records. The head of Manicure, Tom "Ghibli" Mike, recalled, "I just got totally obsessed with it. I put up that one he did, "Light"; we had him up here to DJ a few parties; and then he moved here. That was totally how nightcore became a thing for us." The label's #MANICURED playlist consisted of nightcore renditions of K-pop and electro house tracks, a few of them also incorporating production techniques outside of pitch-shifting and speeding up the source material, such as "Mile High" by Chipped Nails and Ponibbi and "Fave Hours" by F I J I.

By the mid-2010s, the nightcore scene had garnered attention from musicians such as Djemba Djemba, Maxo and Harrison, Nina Las Vegas, Ryan Hemsworth, Lido, Moistbreezy, and PC Music founders Danny L Harle and A. G. Cook. Harle and Cook have claimed nightcore to be influences in interviews, the former saying in an interview,

 A Thump writer described it as the "groundwork for some of the most innovative club music today" and wrote that it also led to a number of "awful" internet memes:

Dance Music Northwest described nightcore as "too catchy, too danceable, and far too much fun to not welcome into the dance music mainstream." David Turner of MTV described a nightcore remix of "7 Years" by Lukas Graham as the same as "the normal [...] song" and "plagiarism."

2020s: TikTok

As social media platform TikTok rose to prominence in the 2020s, music magazine Pitchfork noted: "Much of the music that performs well on TikTok has been modified slightly, either sped-up or slowed-down." Pitchfork quoted one nightcore TikTok creator: "Editors really enjoy sped-up music because edits with sped-up audios are much more energetic and interesting to watch."

See also
 Chopped and screwed
 Audio time stretching and pitch scaling
 Vaporwave

References

External links
 

Internet culture
Electronic music genres
Internet memes
Internet memes introduced in 2001